Charles Anthony Micchelli (born December 22, 1942) is an American mathematician, with an international reputation in numerical analysis, approximation theory, and machine learning.

Biography
As the youngest of four children, he was born into an Italian-American family in Newark, New Jersey. After graduating from Newark's East Side High School, he attended Rutgers University, where he graduated in 1964 with a bachelor's degree in mathematics. He then became a graduate student at Stanford University. After taking a course on Chebyshev polynomials taught by Gábor Szegő, he became interested in approximation theory. Micchelli graduated in 1969 with a PhD from Stanford University. His PhD thesis Saturation Classes and Iterates of Operators was supervised by Samuel Karlin.

Influenced by Gene Golub and recognizing the growing importance of computers and numerical analysis, Micchelli accepted a postgraduate invitation at the University of Uppsala's computer sciences department. On his return to Stanford University he met IBM researcher Theodore J. Rivlin, who was visiting Karlin and Golub. Rivlin recruited Micchelli to become a researcher for the mathematical sciences department of the IBM Thomas J. Watson Research Center in Yorktown Heights, New York. There Micchelli did research from 1970 to 2000 and was a visiting professor at more than twenty universities in various countries, including in Israel, Sweden, Italy, Germany, the United Kingdom, Belgium, Chile, the United States, Spain, Canada, and Singapore. In 2000 he retired as an emeritus of IBM and became a professor of mathematics at the University at Albany, SUNY.

Micchelli is the author or co-author of more than 275 research publications and is on the list of ISI's Highly Cited Researchers. He has made contributions to the theory of total positivity, multivariate splines, refinability, geometric modeling, wavelets, interpolation by radial functions, neural networks, and machine learning theory. In  1974 I. J. Schoenberg presented a new approach to Micchelli's theory of cardinal L-splines. In 1983 Micchelli was an invited speaker at the International Congress of Mathematicians in Warsaw.

Through his numerous research stays at universities, conferences, invitations and even family trips, Micchelli has traveled throughout the world many times, At a mathematical congress, at the Oberwolfach Institute, he began his relationship with the University of Zaragoza (UNIZAR) through a meeting with Professor Mariano Gasca from UNIZAR's department of applied mathematics. Micchelli was on sabbatical at UNIZAR for the academic year 1988–1989 and with Gasca was the co-director in 1989 of a NATO Advanced Study Institute on Computation of Curves and Surfaces in Puerto de la Cruz, Tenerife from July 10 to 21, 1989. Since then, especially in the 1990s, Micchelli has repeatedly visited and contributed academically to UNIZAR, which awarded him an honorary doctorate in 1994.

Starting an organizational effort in 1991, Micchelli was one the founding editors of the journal Advances in Computational Mathematics (with first issue in February 1993) and became the founding co-editor-in-chief with John Charles Mason (1941–2016). Micchelli has also served on the editorial boards of several other international journals.

In 1965 he married his wife Patricia, who was his schoolmate since childhood. They have two children, Craig (born 1970) and Lisa (born 1972). In 2006 Craig A. Micchelli joined the faculty of the department of developmental biology at Washington University School of Medicine in St. Louis.

Selected publications

Articles
 
 
 
 
 
 
 
 
 
  (over 2160 citations)
 
 
 
 
 
 
 
 
 
 
  (over 520 citations)
  (over 980 citations)

Books

As editor
 
  (originally published in 1996 by Kluwer Academic Publishers)

References

1942 births
Living people
20th-century American mathematicians
21st-century American mathematicians
Approximation theorists
Mathematical analysts
Numerical analysts
People from Newark, New Jersey
East Side High School (Newark, New Jersey) alumni
Rutgers University alumni
Stanford University alumni
IBM employees
University at Albany, SUNY faculty
American people of Italian descent